Robert Wayne Kahle (November 23, 1915 – December 16, 1988) was a Major League Baseball player. He played one season with the Boston Bees from April 21 to June 22, 1938.

References

External links

Boston Bees players
Major League Baseball third basemen
Terre Haute Tots players
Greenville Bucks players
Indianapolis Indians players
Hartford Laurels players
Hollywood Stars players
Newark Bears (IL) players
Seattle Rainiers players
Little Rock Travelers players
Baseball players from Indiana
1915 births
1988 deaths